The 2016 Sun Belt Conference baseball tournament was held at Bobcat Ballpark on the campus of the Texas State University in San Marcos, Texas, from May 25 to May 29, 2015.  The tournament used a double-elimination format.  The winner of the tournament earned Sun Belt Conference's automatic bid to the 2016 NCAA Division I baseball tournament.

Seeding
The top eight teams (based on conference results) from the conference earn invites to the tournament.  The teams will be seeded based on conference winning percentage, and will then play a two bracket, double-elimination tournament.  The winner of each bracket will play a championship final.

Results

References

Tournament
Sun Belt Conference Baseball Tournament
Baseball in Texas
Sun Belt Conference baseball tournament
Sun Belt Conference baseball tournament